Conflicto antarcticus is a species of stem waterfowl whose fossils were found in the early Paleocene López de Bertodano Formation of Antarctica, the only species of its genus and the family Conflictonidae. It is characterized by it slender body and long legs, yet possesses a duck-like bill which indicates the form of beak evolved early in Anseriformes.

Description 
Conflicto is known from a single partially complete specimen described in January 2019. It had long legs compared to its body, contrasting what is seen in modern ducks. Its beak had a similar structure to that of ducks and geese, but was not as wide. The rostrum possessed narial openings wider than that of modern Anseriformes. Its neck was about half its body length, possessing (estimated) 15 long vertebrae.

Classification 
Conflicto was a likely a stem anseriform, equally related to the current extant clades. The genus Anatalavis is hypothesized to be less related to the magpie goose as previously thought, but placed as a sister clade to Conflicto, though this isn't conclusive. The phylogenetic classification remains uncertain, but is more likely to be stem-waterfowl rather than crown-waterfowl, separated from modern anseriform lineages.

References 

Anseriformes
Birds of Antarctica
Paleocene animals of Antarctica
Fossils of Antarctica
Fossil taxa described in 2019